Maryna Ivaniuk (born 19 September 1990) is a Ukrainian professional racing cyclist, who most recently rode for the UCI Women's Continental Team .

References

External links

1990 births
Living people
Ukrainian female cyclists
Place of birth missing (living people)
21st-century Ukrainian women